In the 2000–01 season, USM Blida is competing in the National 1 for the 16th season, as well as the Algerian Cup. They will be competing in Ligue 1, and the Algerian Cup.

Squad list

Competitions

Overview

{| class="wikitable" style="text-align: center"
|-
!rowspan=2|Competition
!colspan=8|Record
!rowspan=2|Started round
!rowspan=2|Final position / round
!rowspan=2|First match	
!rowspan=2|Last match
|-
!
!
!
!
!
!
!
!
|-
| National 1

|  
| 4th
| 7 September 2000
| 27 May 2001
|-
| Algerian Cup

| Round of 64 
| Round of 16
| 5 February 2001
| 29 March 2001
|-
! Total

National

League table

Results summary

Results by round

Matches

Algerian Cup

Squad information

Playing statistics
4, 11, 13, 24

|-
! colspan=10 style=background:#dcdcdc; text-align:center| Goalkeepers

|-
! colspan=10 style=background:#dcdcdc; text-align:center| Defenders

|-
! colspan=10 style=background:#dcdcdc; text-align:center| Midfielders

|-
! colspan=10 style=background:#dcdcdc; text-align:center| Forwards

|-
! colspan=10 style=background:#dcdcdc; text-align:center| Players transferred out during the season

Goalscorers
Includes all competitive matches. The list is sorted alphabetically by surname when total goals are equal.

Assists

Clean sheets
Includes all competitive matches.

Hat-tricks

(H) – Home ; (A) – Away

Transfers

In

Out

References

External links
 2000–01 USM Blida season at dzfoot.com 

USM Blida seasons
Algerian football clubs 2000–01 season